The Ashby Woulds Heritage Trail is a footpath and cycleway along what was formerly the Ashby and Nuneaton railway line between Spring Cottage and Measham, Leicestershire, England, a distance of some . There are links to Donisthorpe woodland park, Moira Furnace and Conkers, the main visitor centre for The National Forest, in which the trail now lies.

Features & Activities
There are stone-surfaced paths suitable for cyclists, pedestrians and horse riders.

External links
 Ashby Woulds Heritage Trail

Parks and open spaces in Leicestershire
Heritage trails